The 21st Armoured Brigade "Pindus Cavalry" is a tank formation of the Hellenic Army, based in Komotini, Western Thrace.

History 
The 21st Armoured Brigade was planned in 1968, but delays in acquiring the necessary equipment meant that it began forming at Litochoro on 1 December 1970, and was moved to the Komotini-Alexandroupoli area in September 1971. Upon the completion of its formation in 1971, the Brigade comprised the 211th and 212th Medium Tank Battalions (211 & 212 ΕΜΑ), the 21st Reconnaissance Company (21 ΙΛΑΝ), and various support companies.

From 1977 on, all its sub-units have been concentrated at Komotini. On 1 December 2000, it received the honorific title "Pindus Cavalry Brigade".

Structure 
21st Armoured Brigade "Pindus Cavalry"
 HQ Company (ΙΣΤ)
 211th Medium Tank Battalion (211 ΕΜΑ)
 212th Medium Tank Battalion (212 ΕΜΑ)
 646 Mechanized Infantry Battalion (646 M/K ΤΠ)
 140 Self Propelled Artillery Battalion (140 Α/K ΜΠΒ)
 21st Engineer Company (21 ΛΜΧ)
 21st Signal Company (21 ΛΔΒ)
 21st Support Battalion (21 ΕΥΠ)

References

Armoured brigades of Greece
Komotini
1970 establishments in Greece
Military units and formations established in 1970